Hot Car Competições, racing as Hot Car New Generation, is a Brazilian auto racing team based in Cajamar, São Paulo. Founded in 1990 by Amadeu Rodrigues, the team currently competes in Stock Car Brasil with Gaetano Di Mauro and Lucas Kohl.

References 

Stock Car Brasil teams
Auto racing teams established in 2001
Brazilian auto racing teams

External links